Jormungand, also known as the Midgard Serpent and the World Serpent, is a character appearing in American comic books published by Marvel Comics. The character, based on the serpent Jörmungandr from Norse mythology, first appears in Marvel Tales #105 (Feb. 1952), in the period between the Golden Age of Comic Books and the Silver Age of Comic Books.

Publication history
The Midgard Serpent debuted in Marvel Tales #105 (Feb. 1952) and was later tied firmly to Marvel continuity in the Silver Age of Comic Books in Thor #127 (April 1966). As in Norse mythology, the Marvel version of the Midgard Serpent is the nemesis of the Thunder God, who has two encounters with the creature – the events based directly on mythology – in Thor #272-273 (June-July 1978).

An attempt to cheat the fatal prophecy made regarding a final battle between Thor and the Serpent occurred in Thor #274-278 (July-Dec. 1978), although the creature returned in Thor #325 (Nov. 1982-Jan. 1983). A "larger than life" battle between Thor and the Serpent was depicted in Thor #379-380 (May-June 1987), with writer-artist Walter Simonson using a splash page to depict the creature's size, and then full pages to demonstrate the battle between the pair.

Although killed, the Serpent was resurrected in Thor #486-488 (May-July 1995), and featured in The Avengers vol. 3 #1 (Feb. 1998) before reappearing in Thor vol. 2 #80 (Aug. 2004).

Fictional character biography
The Midgard Serpent first appears when a scientist draws what he believes to be venom from a statue of the creature, the liquid becoming a deadly solvent.

In the realm of Asgard, the seer Volla makes a prophecy that the Thunder God Thor will battle the Midgard Serpent during Ragnarök after it surfaces from the ocean and does terrible damage. Although the god will successfully kill the creature, he will only walk nine steps before dying from wounds carrying its deadly venom.

Thor has two encounters with the creature that reflect the Norse myths. The first is a visit to the castle of the Storm Giant Utgard-Loki, who excels in the use of illusions. Challenging Thor to lift his pet "cat", who in reality is the Midgard Serpent, the Storm Giant is terrified when the Thunder God lifts all but one of the cat's feet off the ground. The second encounter occurs when Thor decides to cheat fate and kill the creature. Taking a fishing boat with the Giant Hymir, Thor uses the head of an ox on a chain to draw the Midgard Serpent to the surface of the ocean. Although the creature takes the bait, Thor is unable to deliver the killing blow as Hymir, fearing for his life, cuts the chain.

Being aware of the prophecy regarding his son's death, Odin (the king of the Norse gods) cheats fate during a false Ragnarok by replacing Thor with a surrogate known as Red Norvell, who, after gaining the power of Thor and his hammer, dies battling the Midgard Serpent after it dives into the ocean. The prophecy fulfilled, Thor drives off the creature. The Midgard Serpent reappears briefly when a group of Odin's enemies feed the Golden Apples of Idunn, intended for the Norse Gods, to the creature, intending to weaken the gods before an attack. It is used as a bridge by Tyr and Loki's army. Thor imprisons the creature and forces it to return the apples.

The character appears on Earth disguised as the monster Fin Fang Foom after some Giants summon him using one of them as bait on a giant fishing rod, and after the deception is revealed battles Thor to the death. He attacks Thor in a park still disguised as Fin Fang Foom, but does not recognize Thor who is wearing his Asgardian armor. After apologizing and talking to Thor, Fin Fang Foom says if Thor can lift his big toe, he will battle the "super hero" (Thor) away from the city. Thor is able to lift his big toe and rides him away from the city. When he realizes he does not know his foe's name, Thor tells him. The presence of the Midgard Serpent on Earth causes time to stop for everything except the two opponents and other mythic creatures. Although Thor finally kills the creature, his body is pulped, suffering from the Curse of Hela: his bones become as brittle as glass, but he is unable to heal or die(Thor "resurrects" himself by taking mental control of the Destroyer and forcing Hela to recreate his body and free him from her curse).

The Midgard Serpent is released from Hel (the Norse land of the dead) by the Asgardian warrior Kurse to use against Thor, who is swallowed by the creature. Together with ally Beta Ray Bill, Thor blasts free of the creature's stomach and kills it a second time.

The Midgard Serpent is apparently resurrected by sorceress Morgan le Fay, who summons the creature to Earth to distract the superhero team the Avengers while she abducts the Scarlet Witch. The Midgard Serpent briefly reappears when the true Ragnarok occurs.

During the "Last Days" part of the Secret Wars storyline, King Loki (a more evil version of Loki from an alternate future) frees the Midgard Serpent from Hel and rides on its back as part of a plot to attack Asgard.

Powers and abilities
The Midgard Serpent normally exists in an ethereal form around Earth. A huge serpent, the character has immense strength and stamina, can generate both lethal fire and venom, and project powerful illusions. He can cause earthquakes by flexing his coils around Earth.

In other media

Television
 Near the end of The Avengers: Earth's Mightiest Heroes episode "A Day Unlike Any Other", Odin banished Loki to a world where he is tortured by the Midgard Serpent.
 The Midgard Serpent appears in the Avengers Assemble episode "The Serpent of Doom". After retrieving Ulik's codgel, Doctor Doom modified it to summon it in a plot to conquer Earth. The Midgard Serpent was so powerful that it would grow until it could consume Earth. After a battle with the Avengers, the Midgard Serpent and Doctor Doom are banished to the Realm Below by the Avengers, who used Ulik's extra-dimensional magic portal. In "The Doomstroyer", the Midgard Serpent serves as Doctor Doom's line of defense at the time when he is controlling the Destroyer. Thor then fights the Midgard Serpent. After Doctor Doom deactivates the Destroyer, the Midgard Serpent is defeated by Thor and Loki. In "Avengers: Impossible", the Midgard Serpent is among the villains summoned to Avengers Tower by the Impossible Man to spice up his show on the Falcon. It causes a rampage on the city until the Impossible Man "scrubs the scene" by making the villains disappear.

Film 
 As revealed in the original concept art for Avengers: Infinity War, Thor, Groot and Rocket Raccoon are shown fighting a big snake, which is confirmed to be the Midgard Serpent. a.k.a. the World Serpent.

Video games
 In the mobile game Thor: Son of Asgard, the Midgard Serpent appears as an enemy, though this version is actually a doppelganger generated by the Dark Elf sorcerer Malekith. After Malekith's defeat, Thor encounters the false Midgard Serpent face-to-face and dispatches it with a lightning blast.
 The Midgard Serpent is also featured in the Thor virtual pinball game for Pinball FX 2 released by Zen Studios.

Footnotes

External links
 

Comics characters introduced in 1952
Marvel Comics supervillains
Marvel Comics male supervillains
Marvel Comics characters with superhuman strength
Characters created by Stan Lee
Norse mythology in Marvel Comics
Fictional illusionists
Fictional snakes
Thor (Marvel Comics)